WIZU-LP (99.9 FM) is a radio station licensed to serve the community of Newark, Delaware. The station is owned by Newark Community Radio Inc. It airs a science-focused talk radio format.

The station was assigned the WIZU-LP call letters by the Federal Communications Commission on February 14, 2014.

Radio Newark organized and facilitated communication between Delcastle Technical High School (New Castle County Vo-Tech School District) and Dr. Serena Auñon-Chancellor aboard the International Space Station as part of NASA's ARISS Program in October, 2018.  The station coordinated a display of space suits provided by ILC Dover.

References

External links
 Official Website
 

IZU-LP
IZU-LP
Radio stations established in 2017
2017 establishments in Delaware
Talk radio stations in the United States
New Castle County, Delaware